Ijaz Ahmed (Urdu: اعجاز احمد) (born February 2, 1969 in Lyallpur, Punjab, Pakistan) is a former Pakistani cricketer who played in 2 Tests in 1995 and 2 ODIs in 1997.

1969 births
Living people
Pakistan Test cricketers
Pakistan One Day International cricketers
Faisalabad cricketers
Pakistan Railways cricketers
Allied Bank Limited cricketers
Faisalabad Wolves cricketers
Pakistani cricket coaches
Cricketers from Faisalabad